This is a list of supermarket chains in Austria. (As of April 2017)

References

Supermarket
Austria